Sarah Haider is a Pakistani-American writer, public speaker, and political activist. She created the advocacy group Ex-Muslims of North America (EXMNA), which seeks to normalize religious dissent and to help former Muslims leave the religion by linking them to support networks. She is the co-founder and director of development for EXMNA.

Early life
Haider was born in Karachi, Pakistan, in a practicing Shia Muslim family. Her family moved to the United States when she was seven years old and she was raised in Houston, Texas. She was a devout Shia Muslim as a child. In a 2017 interview with the blog Gene Expression, she said of her religious participation:

She became an atheist at the age of 16. She believes that she was lucky enough to have a relatively liberal father who may not have let her wear shorts or have boyfriends but still allowed her to read any books she wanted, including those critical of Islam, and allowed her to move away from home to go to college. Her journey into questioning religion began when her atheist friends in high school started having debates with her. One of her friends would print off "horrible" verses from the Quran and would hand them to her without any further commentary. She set out to prove her atheist friends wrong and started studying the Quran to understand the context of these verses. However, she stated that sometimes the context was worse and she slowly became an atheist.

Her father has since become an atheist as well. Haider described the journey to atheism with her father to the Reason Rally in 2016 as a long series of debates spanning over a decade. However, it was not until her father discovered Facebook groups of other Pakistani atheists that had active members who were his age that he felt comfortable leaving Islam. She now advises ex-Muslims to find their family secular peers to make them more comfortable leaving religion.

After finishing college, she moved to Washington, DC, and became involved with non-profit and social advocacy groups. This involvement inspired her to launch her own non-profit advocacy group later on. She currently lives in Washington, DC.

Activism 

In 2013 Haider and Muhammad Syed co-founded Ex-Muslims of North America (EXMNA), an advocacy organization and online community which aims to normalize religious dissent and to helping create local support communities for those who have left Islam. The organization was first based in just Washington, DC, and Toronto, but is now active in over 25 locations in the United States and Canada.

EXMNA believes Muslim communities often shun those who are accused of apostasy as well as their families and that fear of excommunication and violence makes it dangerous for closeted ex-Muslims if they are exposed as disbelievers. They have stated that Islamic "apostates live with a level of threat that influences every aspect of life," because when someone leaves the faith they often lose their community and social support including their mosque, their friends, and even potentially their family. This is the reason why EXMNA believes that it is very important to normalize dissent in religious communities and why they have created a network of social support for those who chose to leave Islam. Due to the fear of apostates being "outed," EXMNA has a lengthy screening process to ensure the security and safety of EXMNA members.

In 2015 she gave a speech called "Islam and the Necessity of Liberal Critique" at the American Humanist Association's 74th annual conference in Denver, Colorado, that has been widely viewed since uploaded to YouTube. During an interview with Dave Rubin she said she was nervous to deliver the speech, believing the topic of Islam and dissent to be "sensitive", yet was delighted at how well the speech was received. Haider, a self-described liberal, is disheartened by what she feels is a hostile attitude towards Ex-Muslims by her fellow liberals. She has said women who leave Islam often "face ostracism, beatings, harassment and threats from their families and communities, forced travel back to home countries to pry them free of Western influence, and forced marriage," and therefore should be among the most welcomed by the liberal community. However, she feels that she and other Ex-Muslims are shunned by the left, having been called an Islamophobe. Haider has stated that this makes the position of Ex-Muslim atheists precarious because "the political right is not our friend. We don't have allies on the right due to our atheism," but at the same time she feels Ex-Muslims also have very few allies on the left.

In 2017 Haider decided to take EXMNA on a tour around the United States and Canada to speak at college campuses throughout the 2017–2018 academic year. EXMNA spoke on a variety of topics that affect Muslims and ex-Muslims.

See also
 Ali A. Rizvi, Pakistani-born Canadian ex-Muslim activist and writer
 Aliyah Saleem, Pakistani-born British ex-Muslim activist from Faith to Faithless
 Maryam Namazie, Iranian-born British ex-Muslim activist
 Muhammad Syed, Pakistani-American writer, speaker, and political activist who helped Sarah Haider co-found Ex-Muslims of North America
 Fauzia Ilyas, Pakistani-born Dutch ex-Muslim activist
 Ibn Warraq, India-born Pakistani ex-Muslim scholar-writer and humanist
 List of ex-Muslim organizations

References

External links
 

1991 births
21st-century atheists
American atheism activists
American feminists
American former Shia Muslims
American writers of Pakistani descent
Articles containing video clips
Former Muslim critics of Islam
Former Muslims turned agnostics or atheists
Living people
American critics of Islam
Pakistani atheists
Pakistani emigrants to the United States
Pakistani former Shia Muslims
People from Houston
People from Karachi
Writers from Houston
Writers from Karachi